Gangu County is a county in the southeast of Gansu province, the People's Republic of China. It is under the administration of Tianshui City and is the most populous county in Gansu. Its postal code is 741200, and in 1999 its population was 570,318 people.

It was established by Duke Wu of Qin in 688 BC as Ji County (冀县), this has led it to be called the 'oldest Chinese county. Gangu was a stop on the Silk Road,  as a tea and horse market, and as a stopover for traders. It remains a regional trading centre.

Between 1958 and 1962, Gangu and Wushan County were merged.

Culture 
Gangu is known for its pepper variety, sold in China as Gangu pepper. Local culture includes Wushu martial arts and the sculpturing of animal ornaments on traditional Chinese roofs.

Administrative divisions
Gangu County is divided to 13 towns and 2 townships.
Towns

Townships
 Xiejiawan Township()
 Baijiawan Township

Climate

Famous residents 

 Jiang Wei (202-264), general
 Yang Fu (Han dynasty), politician
 Shi Yanjue, president of the Buddhist Association of China

See also
 List of administrative divisions of Gansu

References

Gangu County
Tianshui